The Eye of the Storm is an Australian drama film directed by Fred Schepisi. It is an adaptation of Patrick White's 1973 novel of the same name. It stars Geoffrey Rush, Charlotte Rampling and Judy Davis. It won the critics award for best Australian feature at the 2011 Melbourne International Film Festival and had a September 2011 theatrical release.

Plot
In a Sydney suburb, two nurses, a housekeeper and a solicitor attend to Elizabeth Hunter as her expatriate son and daughter convene at her deathbed. In dying, as in living, Mrs. Hunter remains a formidable force on those around her. It is via Mrs Hunter’s authority over living that her household and children vicariously face death and struggle to give consequence to life.

Estranged from a mother who was never capable of loving them Sir Basil, a famous but struggling actor in London and Dorothy, an impecunious French princess, attempt to reconcile with her. In doing so they are reduced from states of worldly sophistication to floundering life.

The children unite in a common goal — to leave Australia with their vast inheritance. Moving through Sydney’s social scene, they search for a way to fulfill their desire. Using the reluctant services of their family lawyer Arnold Wyburd, who was long in love with Mrs Hunter, they scheme to place their mother in a society nursing home to expedite her demise.

Panic sets in as the staff sense the impending end of their eccentric world. Mrs Hunter confesses her profound disappointment at failing to recreate the state of humility and grace she experienced when caught in the eye of a cyclone fifteen years earlier.

For the first time in their lives, the meaning of compassion takes the children by surprise. During a ferocious storm Mrs Hunter finally dies, not through a withdrawal of will but by an assertion of it. In the process of dying she re-lives her experience in the cyclone. Standing on a beach, she is calm and serene as devastation surrounds her.

Cast
Geoffrey Rush as Basil Hunter 
Charlotte Rampling as Elizabeth Hunter
Judy Davis as Dorothy de Lascabanes 
John Gaden as Arnold Wyburd 
Robyn Nevin as Lal
Helen Morse as Lotte
Colin Friels as Athol Shreve
Dustin Clare as Col
Elizabeth Alexander as Cherry Cheesman
Maria Theodorakis as Mary DeSantis
Alexandra Schepisi as Flora
Laurent Boulanger as French Waiter

Awards

References

External links
 
 

Films directed by Fred Schepisi
2011 films
2010s English-language films
2011 drama films
Films about dysfunctional families
Films based on Australian novels
Films shot in Melbourne
Films set in 1972
Films set in the 1970s
Films set in Sydney
Australian drama films
Screen Australia films
Transmission Films films